A Dream may refer to:

Literature
 A Dream (novel) or Somnium, by Johannes Kepler, 1634
 "A Dream" (Blake poem), by William Blake, 1789
 "A Dream" (Poe poem), by Edgar Allan Poe, 1827
 "A Dream" (short story), by Franz Kafka

Music
 A Dream (album), by Max Romeo, 1969
 "A Dream" (Common song), 2006
 "A Dream" (DeBarge song), 1983
 "A Dream", a song by Jay-Z from The Blueprint 2: The Gift & The Curse, 2002

See also
 Dream (disambiguation)